Lesbian, gay, bisexual, and transgender (LGBT) persons in  Guinea-Bissau face legal challenges not experienced by non-LGBT residents. Same-sex sexual activity is legal in Guinea-Bissau, but same-sex couples and households headed by same-sex couples are not eligible for the same legal protections available to opposite-sex couples.

Law regarding same-sex sexual activity
The Penal Code which remained in force after the independence from Portugal was repealed in 1993 with the enactment of a new Code (Law-decree No. 4/93) which contains no provisions criminalising consensual same-sex sexual acts between adults. 

In December 2008, Guinea-Bissau became one of 66 nations to sign the "United Nations Statement on Human Rights, Sexual Orientation and Gender Identity", which supports decriminalization of homosexuality and transgender identity.

Recognition of same-sex relationships
The U.S. Department of State's 2011 Human Rights Report found that, "the law (in 2011) only recognized heterosexual married couples as entitled to larger government housing."

Adoption and family planning
According to a website of the French government, single and married people are eligible to adopt children. The website does not say whether LGBT people are disqualified.

Living conditions
Of 19 African countries surveyed in 2010, Guinea-Bissau was one of the most tolerant about homosexual behavior. Nine percent in Guinea-Bissau said that homosexual behavior was morally acceptable, with fifteen percent saying it was not an issue.

The U.S. Department of State's 2012 human rights report found that,There are no laws that criminalize sexual orientation. Antidiscrimination laws do not apply to lesbian, gay, bisexual, and transgender individuals. There were no reported violent incidents or other human rights abuses targeting individuals based on their sexual orientation or identity. There was no official discrimination based on sexual orientation or gender identity in employment or access to education and health care. However, according to government guidelines for civil servants' housing allowances, only heterosexual married couples were entitled to family-size housing, while same-sex couples received the single person allotment. Social taboos against homosexuality sometimes restricted freedom to express sexual orientation, yet society was relatively tolerant of consensual same-sex conduct, according to a 2010 study by the Pew Research Center.In 2018, a local NGO director stated that there were some cases of violence targeting people based on their sexual orientation or gender identity and stressed that Guinea-Bissau lacks legal protections for LGBTI people.

Summary table

See also

Human rights in Africa
LGBT rights in Africa

References

Human rights in Guinea-Bissau
Guinea Bissau
Gender in Guinea-Bissau
Law of Guinea-Bissau
Politics of Guinea-Bissau